The Charlotte Fire Department provides fire suppression, emergency medical services, technical rescue services, hazardous materials mitigation, disaster response, code enforcement, fire investigations, and public education for the city of Charlotte, North Carolina. The Charlotte Fire Department was officially formed in 1875, although fire services existed in the area for decades before that.

Stations and apparatus 
 this is the current list of stations and apparatus for the department:

See also 
 Fire Station No. 2 (Charlotte, North Carolina)
 Palmer Fire School

References

Organizations established in 1887
Fire departments in North Carolina
Fire
Fire